Rock Champions may refer to:

 Rock Champions (April Wine album), 2000
 Rock Champions, album by Black Sabbath
 Rock Champions, album by Grand Funk Railroad
 Rock Champions (Great White album), 2000
 Poison – Rock Champions, album
 Rock Champions, album by The Quireboys
 Rock Champions, album by Saxon
 Rock Champions, album by Thunder
 Rock Champions, album by UFO
 Rock Champions, album by Uriah Heep

See also
 Champions of Rock, album by April Wine
 Champions of Rock, album by Blue Öyster Cult
 Champions of Rock, album by Robin Trower
 Champions of Rock, album by UFO